Renārs is a Latvian masculine given name and may refer to:
Renārs Doršs (born 1985), Latvian alpine skier
Renārs Kaupers (born 1974), Latvian pop singer-songwriter 
Renārs Rode (born 1989), Latvian footballer

References

Latvian masculine given names